This is a list of television programs broadcast by the former Canadian television channel M3.

Former programs

#
 100 Greatest...
 100 Most Shocking Music Moments

A-E
 The ABCs of Rock
 America's Next Top Model
 Anger Management
 Arrow
 Back In...
 BackTrax
 Bands Reunited
 Before They Were Rock Stars
 Behind the Music
 Best Ink
 Born to Diva
 Boston's Finest
 Brooke Knows Best
 But Can They Sing?
 Candidly Nicole
 Cash Cab
 Celebracadabra
 Celebrity Duets
 Celebrity Fit Club
 Celebrity Rehab with Dr. Drew
 The Chris Isaak Show
 Classic Albums
 Clip Trip
 The Club
 The Colbert Report
 Confessions of a Teen Idol
 Coolio's Rules
 Daily Fix
Dance Your Ass Off
 Dancing with the Stars
 Dating Naked
 Deeper
 A Different World
 Don't Forget The Lyrics (U.S. primetime version and syndicated version)
 Driven
 E! True Hollywood Story
 Ed
 Ed Sullivan's Rock 'n' Roll Classics
 Ego trip's The (White) Rapper Show
 Entourage
 Evolution

F-J
 The Fabulous Life of...
 The Fall
 Fame
 Fan Club
 The First Family
 The Flash
 Flavor of Love
 Franklin & Bash
 Freaks and Geeks
 Freshly Pressed
 Gilmore Girls
 Gogglebox
 The Goldbergs
 Gotham
 HeatMeter
 Hey Paula
 Hit Me Baby One More Time
 Hogan Knows Best
 Hollywood Game Night
 Hoppus On Music
 Hot in Cleveland
 I Know My Kid's a Star
 I’m a Celebrity... Get Me out of Here!
 Intimate and Interactive
 It Takes a Choir
 Jennifer Falls
 Just Shoot Me

K-O
 Kept
 The Late Late Show with James Corden
 Let's Talk About Pep
 Listed
 Live from Abbey Road
 Living With...
 The Loop
 Love Monkey
 Luke's Parental Advisory
 Mama Drama
 Marshal Law: Texas
 MasterChef
 MasterChef Canada
 The McCarthys
 The Mentalist
 Michael Jackson: The Trial
 Mike & Molly
 Mission: Man Band
 MMOnStage
 MMM Profile
 The Monkees
 Motormouth
 Mr. Box Office
 MuchMore With...
 MuchMoreMusic Live
 My Favourite Things
 The Mysteries of Laura
 The NewMusic
 NewsRadio
 Nosedive
 The O.C.

P-T
 Parks and Recreation
 Partridge Family
 Party of Five
 The People's Couch
 Perception
 Person of Interest
 Personals
 Pop Quiz
 Pop-up Video
 Popaganda
 The Power Hour
 Pretty Little Liars
 The Princes of Malibu
 Raising The Bar
 Ravenswood
 Reign
 Reloaded
 Retro Boogie Dance Party
 RetroRequest
 Revival
 Rock & Roll Jeopardy!
 The Rock Life
 RuPaul's Drag Race
 The Salt-N-Pepa Show
 Satisfaction
 Saturday Night Live 
 Signed, Sealed, Delivered
 Scott Baio Is 45...and Single
 Scott Baio Is 46...and Pregnant
 The Smoke
 So You Think You Can Dance?
 Sober House 2
 The Social
 SpeakEasy
 Spun Out
 The Story Of...
 Storytellers
 Strange Love
 SuperGroup
 Supernatural
 The Surreal Life
 The Surreal Life: Fame Games
 Switch
 Take 2...
 Tattoos After Dark
 Test Pattern
 Tip of My Tongue
 Tommy Lee Goes to College
 True Blood
 TV Moments

U-Z
 Uncovered
 The Vampire Diaries
 VH1: All Access
 VH1 Divas
 VH1's Legends
 Video on Trial
 VideoFACT
 The Voice
 Where You At, Baby?!
 Wonderland
 Younger

Video blocks
 80s@8
 90s@9'''
 All Time Top 10 Big Tunes First Spin Singles Juiced! MMMTop5.com MuchMoreRetro Now and Then Videoflow Playlist PunchMuchMoreRetro Ranked! Retro 30 Rock Show''

References

See also
 List of programs broadcast by MuchMusic

Lists of television series by network